Anonymous 4 was an American female a cappella quartet, founded in 1986 and based in New York City. Their main performance genre was medieval music, although later they also premiered works by recent composers such as John Tavener and Steve Reich. 

The name of the group is a pun on the name used to refer to an anonymous English music theorist of the late 13th century, Anonymous IV, who is the principal source on the two famous composers of the Notre Dame school, Léonin and Pérotin.

Anonymous 4 performed in cities throughout North America, and were regulars at major international festivals.  The 2003–2004 season was their last as a full-time recording and touring ensemble, but they continued to tour and make recordings while pursuing individual projects. 

The group collaborated with the Chilingirian Quartet on their 2003 album Darkness Into Light and The Mountain Goats on their 2012 album Transcendental Youth as well as with Christopher Tin in 2009 on his album Calling All Dawns, and in 2014 on The Drop That Contained the Sea.

The CD 1865, which features songs from the Civil War with Bruce Molsky on guitar, fiddle, banjo, and vocals was their final recording. The ensemble disbanded at the end of the 2015–2016 season.

Lineup
The original lineup included Johanna Maria Rose, Marsha Genensky, Susan Hellauer, and Ruth Cunningham. In 1998, Cunningham left and was replaced by Jacqueline Horner-Kwiatek. In 2008, Cunningham returned to the group in place of Johanna Maria Rose until their 2016 disbanding. Genensky grew up in California in the foothills of the Santa Monica Mountains; Hellauer was born and raised in the Bronx, New York; Cunningham was brought up in Millbrook, New York; Rose grew up in the village of Grand View-on-Hudson, New York; and Horner-Kwiatek is from Monkstown, County Antrim, in Northern Ireland (she won her Green Card in the Diversity Immigrant Visa program, commonly known as the "Green Card Lottery").

Discography

References

External links
 Official website
 
 Discography at SonyBMG Masterworks
 Two entries ([ first], [ second]) on AllMusic

Vocal quartets
Early music choirs
Medieval musical groups
American vocal groups
Musical groups from New York City
Musical groups established in 1992
Musical groups disestablished in 2016